Khatron Ke Khiladi is a 2001 Indian Hindi-language action film directed by Imraan Khalid and produced by Sanjay Chaturvedi, starring Mithun Chakraborty and Raj Babbar.

Plot 
Four criminals escape from prison and take shelter in a village. They meet an ex army personnel who assigns them a noble but dangerous mission to reform them.

Cast 
Mithun Chakraborty as Chhaila Bihari
Raj Babbar as Thakur Ajay Pratap Singh and Captain Vijay  Pratap Singh (Dual Role) 
Pooja Gandhi
Ronit Roy
Puru Raaj Kumar as Ranjha Hindustani
Sudesh Berry as Baazigar
Rutika Singh
Shweta Menon 
Ishrat Ali 
Kiran Kumar as Ali 
Aushim Khetrapal 
Vishwajeet Pradhan Inspector Anokhelal
Asha Sachdev 
Rami Reddy  Torture
Amit Pachori Sanjay Pratap Singh
Tej Sapru Vishnu Pratap Singh
Sheel Jahangira

Soundtrack

References

External links 

Full Hyderabad review

2000s Hindi-language films
2001 films
Mithun's Dream Factory films
Films shot in Ooty
Indian action films